Elliott Gotkine is Bloomberg Television's former Middle East Editor. He was previously the BBC's South America Correspondent, based in Buenos Aires.

Background 

Elliott Gotkine was born on 25 December 1975 in London, England.  He studied Geography at the University of Nottingham and graduated in 1998.

Career 

In November 1998, Elliott Gotkine became a production runner for the London News Network.  From April to August 1999 he became a reporter for Euromoney's International Financial Law Review. Following this he was Deputy Stock Market Editor for the now-defunct UK-iNvest.com until December 2000.

Elliott Gotkine first joined the BBC in January 2001 as a broadcast journalist with BBC Business.  He was a video journalist for the BBC's World Business Report programme from May to August 2002.  He was the BBC's Lima Correspondent from September 2002 to August 2003.  It was during this time that he interviewed Peru's Mario Vargas Llosa, the Nobel prize-winning novelist, for the BBC, an event he considers a highlight of his career. During this time he also filed for The Observer, The Jerusalem Report, People magazine and National Public Radio.

In September 2003 Elliott Gotkine was posted to Buenos Aires, as the BBC's South America Correspondent. He covered stories including Maradona's brush with death in 2004, anti-government protests in Bolivia and the plight of the internally displaced in Colombia. He has interviewed former Venezuelan President Hugo Chavez, Evo Morales of Bolivia, and the former Presidents of Ecuador and Peru, Lucio Gutierrez and Alejandro Toledo.

One of his pieces - a From Our Own Correspondent musing on Bolivia's navy—appears in the book of the same name, commemorating the 50th anniversary of the eponymous BBC programme.

In January 2007, Elliott Gotkine joined Bloomberg Television as a Business Reporter, before being promoted to the role of Europe Business Editor. He reported on major international events including the 2012 Greek elections; the Irish bailout; and the nationalization of Royal Bank of Scotland.

In February 2013, Elliott Gotkine took up the newly created role of Middle-East Editor. Based in Tel-Aviv, he was the only international broadcaster in Israel focusing on company news, the economy and technology.

In September 2016, he left Bloomberg. He now freelances for CNN.

Sources 

1975 births
Living people
British male journalists
Gotkin, Elliott